is a railway station on the Hidaka Main Line in Urakawa, Hokkaido, Japan, operated by the Hokkaido Railway Company (JR Hokkaido).

Adjacent stations

History
The station opened on 24 October 1935. With the privatization of Japanese National Railways (JNR) on 1 April 1987, the station came under the control of JR Hokkaido.

See also
 List of railway stations in Japan

References

Railway stations in Hokkaido Prefecture
Railway stations in Japan opened in 1935
Railway stations closed in 2021